

"Comet Lake-S" (14 nm)

Xeon W-12xx (uniprocessor) 
 -E: embedded
 -P: high performance (and power), with cTDP down to 95 W
 -T: low power

"Comet Lake-H" (14 nm)

Xeon W-10xxxM (uniprocessor)

References 

 
 
 

Intel Xeon (Comet Lake)